The following is the qualification system and qualified countries for the Water skiing at the 2023 Pan American Games competitions.

Qualification system
A total of 48 athletes will qualify to compete at the games. The host nation, Chile, automatically qualifies four athletes in water ski and two in wakeboard. The top seven nations at the 2022 Pan American Water Skiing Championship will each receive four athlete quotas. A further 7 spots are made available for wakeboard qualifiers in each event.

Qualification timeline

Qualification summary

Water skiing

Wakeboarding
A total of eight countries qualified in wakeboarding.

References

Qualification for the 2023 Pan American Games